See also 1717 in piracy, 1719 in piracy, and Timeline of piracy.

Events

Baltic Sea
 Lars Gathenhielm dies and his wife Ingela Gathenhielm succeeds him as the head of the Privateer and Pirate fleet of the Baltic Sea.

Caribbean Sea
March 28 - One of Blackbeard's lieutenants, captain Richard and his sloop Revenge, attack the 400-ton Protestant Caesar in the Bay of Honduras.
March–April - Charles Vane and 12 pirates capture a Jamaica sloop in the Bahamas, retaining her for his own use.
April - Vane captures the sloop Lark in the Bahamas and transfers his crew to her.
April 5 - Blackbeard captures the logwood cutting sloop Land of Promise captained by Thomas Newton
April 9 - Blackbeard's flotilla, including the Queen Anne's Revenge, Adventure and Revenge, loot and burn the Protestant Caesar out of Boston.
April–July 4 - Vane robs seven French and English vessels in the Bahamas.
Summer - Howell Davis is turned in as a pirate by the Cadogan'''s crew and is imprisoned on Barbados. He is eventually released for lack of evidence.
July 24–25 - Woodes Rogers arrives at Nassau, Bahamas with two warships to assume his post as governor. Most of the pirates welcome him, except Vane, who sails away shooting at Rogers' vessels.
July 27 - Vane captures a sloop from Barbados and incorporates it in his fleet.
July 29 - Vane captures the John and Elizabeth, looting some pieces of eight.
Autumn
Howell Davis leads a mutiny on Rogers' sloop Buck and turns back to piracy.  He captures two French ships and a Spanish sloop off Hispaniola.
Vane plunders the inhabitants of Isleatherer (Eleuthera?).
October - Richard Worley's pirates seize a sloop and a brigantine in the Bahamas.
Late November - Vane attacks a French vessel in the Windward Passage, but flees upon discovering it is a warship. The incident causes bad blood between Vane and his quartermaster, Calico Jack Rackham, who favored continuing the attack.
December - Vane captures a sloop and two periaguas off northwest Jamaica.
December 9–10 - John Auger and eight of his pirates are convicted and sentenced to death for piracy at Nassau, Bahamas
December 16 - Vane captures the sloop Pearl in the Bay of Honduras.

North America
May 22 - Blackbeard blockades Charleston, South Carolina with a flotilla of four ships. Five vessels are captured, all merchant traffic is stopped, and several Charleston citizens are held hostage until a ransom of medicines is paid.
June 10 - Blackbeard runs his flagship, the Queen Anne's Revenge and sloop Adventure, aground and maroons half his pirate crew.
Early June - Blackbeard and Stede Bonnet surrender to North Carolina governor Charles Eden and are pardoned under the Act of Grace, but both soon return to piracy.
Late June - Blackbeard captures five ships between Bermuda and North Carolina.
June–July - Bonnet in the sloop Royal James (ex-Revenge) captures 13 vessels between North Carolina and Delaware Bay.
August 12 - Bonnet captures a shallop in the Cape Fear River.
August 30 - Vane takes and ransacks the ships Neptune and Emperor off the Carolinas.
Early September - Vane attacks the shipping off Charleston, capturing five vessels. Vane's subordinate, Yeats, defects to the Charleston governor with a sloop, surrendering and accepting a pardon under the Act of Grace.
September - Pirates led by Richard Worley, in an open boat, rob a shallop and commandeer two sloops in the Delaware River.
September 27 - Bonnet and his men are captured by Colonel William Rhett with two sloops in the battle of Cape Fear River.
October 23 - Vane sacks a brigantine and a sloop off Long Island, New York.
October 24-November 5–33 men captured from Bonnet's sloop Royal James are put on trial before Sir Nicholas Trott in Charleston. 29 are convicted and sentenced to death.
Late October - Pirate captain Richard Worley is killed and his two vessels captured in a battle with a squadron of four South Carolinian vessels in Charleston harbor.
November 8–22 pirates of Stede Bonnet's crew are hanged in Charleston.
November 10–12 - Stede Bonnet is tried for piracy, convicted, and sentenced to death by Sir Nicholas Trott in Charleston.
November 22 - Blackbeard is killed and his crew captured by Robert Maynard's men in a battle at Ocracoke Inlet.
December 10 - Bonnet is hanged in Charleston.

West Africa
Summer-Autumn - Edward England prowls off Sierra Leone, capturing several vessels including the snow Cadogan, whose commanding officer, Captain Skinner, is murdered. England then gives the Cadogan'' to his mate, Howell Davis.

Deaths
Late October - Richard Worley, American pirate captain (birthdate unknown).
November 22 - Edward Teach, alias Blackbeard, killed in battle (born c. 1680).
December 10 - Stede Bonnet, the so-called Gentleman Pirate, hanged (born c. 1688).
April 25 - Lars Gathenhielm

References 

Piracy
Piracy by year
1718 in military history